Ivar Svendsen (November 4, 1929 – October 9, 2015) was a Norwegian actor.

Filmography
 1950: To mistenkelige personer as Gustav
 1955: Savnet siden mandag as Gunnar Holm
 1960: Omringet as Per

References

External links
 
 Ivar Svendsen at Filmfront

1929 births
2015 deaths
20th-century Norwegian male actors